Iran TV Network (ITN) is a Canadian exempt Category B Persian language specialty channel. It is wholly owned by Ethnic Channels Group with its name and programming used under license from the American-based TV channel Iran TV Network.

ITN is a general entertainment service, it airs programming aimed at the entire family including news, dramas, reality series, music, sports and more.

History
In November 2004, Ethnic Channels Group was granted approval from the Canadian Radio-television and Telecommunications Commission (CRTC) to launch a television channel called Persian/Iranian TV, described as "a national ethnic Category 2 specialty programming undertaking devoted to providing programming primarily to the Persian-, Azeri-, Kurdish-, Armenian- and Assyrian-speaking communities."

The channel was launched in early 2006 as Iran TV Network (ITN) and featured programming from US-based channel, Iran TV Network. In early 2010, the channel was renamed Jaam-e-Jam and began featuring programming from Jaam-e-Jam International in Iran. In May 2015, the channel was renamed 'Iran TV Network' once again due to loss of programming from Jaam-e-Jam.

On August 30, 2013, the CRTC approved Ethnic Channels Group's request to convert Jaam-e-Jam from a licensed Category B specialty service to an exempted Cat. B third language service.

In 2020, both Bell Fibe TV and Telus TV, the only providers that carried the channel, dropped it from their line-ups, rendering the channel no longer available. It continues to broadcast on satellite and is available throughout North America as well as parts of Europe, North Africa, Middle East and Asia.

References

External links
 Iran TV Network

Defunct television networks in Canada
Iranian-Canadian organizations
Persian-language television stations
Digital cable television networks in Canada
Middle Eastern television in Canada
Multicultural and ethnic television in Canada